"Free Me" is a song by English singer and songwriter Joss Stone from her fourth studio album, Colour Me Free!, (released on 20 October 2009 in the US). The track was released on 8 November 2009 and is currently the only single for the album. The song was a commercial failure, only charting in four countries, without reaching a top ten position. A music video was not released. It embodies portions of "Do the Dirt" by The Meters.

Stone wrote the song as a protest song against her label, EMI. In the song, Stone sings that she cannot be told what to do. In the outro, she even sings "Free me, free me, EMI". It was reported that Stone wanted to leave EMI, but EMI didn't want to end the four-album contract Stone signed in 2006. Before Colour Me Free, she had only released one out of the four albums that were in her contract. It was announced Stone left EMI, and is now assigned to a new label called "Stone'd Records", based in New York City and Bristol. EMI/Virgin retained the rights to her previously released songs and released the compilation album The Best of Joss Stone 2003–2009 which included the song "Free Me".

In 2010, the song was featured in the trailer for the film, Morning Glory.

Track listing

 "Free Me"
 "I Get High"

Charts

References

2009 singles
Joss Stone songs
Songs written by Joss Stone
2009 songs
Virgin Records singles
Songs written by Conner Reeves
Songs written by Jonathan Shorten